Walter Bortz may refer to:

 Walter Bortz II (born 1930), American physician and author
 Walter M. Bortz III, educator and higher education administrator